Murder in the First may refer to:

 Murder in the First (film), a 1995 film starring Christian Slater, Kevin Bacon, and Gary Oldman
 Murder in the First (TV series), a 2014 television detective drama on TNT